India Hair (born 1987) is a French actress. She was born in Saumur to an American father and an English mother. Her film credits include Camille Rewinds, Jacky in Women's Kingdom, Brèves de comptoir and High Society.  She has also appeared in the television series Boulevard du Palais.

Filmography

References

External links

French film actresses
21st-century French actresses
Most Promising Actress Lumières Award winners
Living people
1987 births
People from Saumur